The 1978 Eastern 8 men's basketball tournament was the second season of the American men's basketball postseason competition now known as the Atlantic 10 men's basketball tournament. It was organized by the Eastern Athletic Association, popularly known as the "Eastern 8", an NCAA Division I basketball-only conference that began competition in the 1976–77 season. The conference adopted its current name of Atlantic 10 Conference in 1982.

The 1978 tournament winner was the Villanova Wildcats team.

Bracket

External links

Atlantic 10 men's basketball tournament
Tournament
Eastern 8 men's basketball tournament
Eastern 8 men's basketball tournament